Kang Byung-kyu (Korean: 강병규, born 30 June 1972) is a South Korean former baseballer and broadcaster.

Career 
Born in 1972, Kang started his baseball career while he was attending to Sungnam High School in the 1990s. He joined the Doosan Bears in 1991.

Following his retirement in 2001, Kang started a new life as a broadcaster. From 2005 to 2006, he was one of co-emcees of Crisis Escape No. 1, along with Lee Hyuk-jae. Both received an appreciation plaque from the Ministry of Labour in 2006. He also hosted Vitamin till 2008 when he resigned after a controversy related to the 2008 Summer Olympics.

Though being inactive for several years, in 2015, he showed his intention to not return for TV broadcasting. Instead, he officially returned as an online broadcaster in 2018. In 2019, he attended to a protest supporting Cho Kuk as the Minister of Justice.

Controversies 
Kang was widely accused in 2008 when he was reported for gambling at the Philippines. He admitted the incident a month before he was arrested.

In 2020, Kang provoked a controversy when he made a defamatory remark against Yoon Chung-ja, whose son (Min Pyung-ki) was victimised at ROKS Cheonan sinking 10 years ago. The controversial remark was written on his Twitter on 29 March, 3 days after when Yoon asked Moon to explain about who had occurred the tragedy.

Following the incident, Chung Jin-seok, a United Future MP, condemned Kang for the remark. He also added that Kang is the one should be punished.

Filmography

Variety show 
 Super TV Sunday is Fun
 Sunday is 101%
 Freedom Declaration — Saturday War
 Crisis Escape No. 1
 Vitamin
 Good Buddies
 1000 Song Challenge

References

External links 
 Kang Byung-kyu on Twitter
 Kang Byung-kyu on YouTube

1972 births
Living people
South Korean broadcasters
South Korean baseball players